The Cathedral of the Nativity of the Blessed Virgin Mary may refer to:

Croatia
 , cathedral of the former Roman Catholic Diocese of Skradin

Ethiopia
 , mother church of the Ethiopian Catholic Church

Poland
Cathedral Basilica of the Nativity of the Blessed Virgin Mary, Tarnów
Co-Cathedral of the Nativity of the Blessed Virgin Mary, Żywiec

Russia
 Rostov-on-Don Cathedral

United States
Cathedral of the Nativity of the Blessed Virgin Mary (Biloxi, Mississippi)
Cathedral of the Nativity of the Blessed Virgin Mary (Grand Island, Nebraska) 
Cathedral of the Nativity of the Blessed Virgin Mary (Juneau, Alaska)

See also
 Cathedral of the Nativity (disambiguation)
 Church of the Nativity of the Blessed Virgin Mary (disambiguation)
 Church of the Nativity of the Theotokos (disambiguation)